Kathy Stein (born 1955) is an attorney, former member of the Kentucky General Assembly and retired circuit clerk judge. She served in the Kentucky House of Representatives from 1997 to 2009 before being elected to represent the 13th Kentucky Senate district in 2009, serving until 2013 when she was appointed to the Kentucky 22nd Circuit Court 6th Division by Kentucky Governor Steve Beshear. 

Stein was a member of the Women's Political Caucus, the Criminal Justice Council, and the Governor's Council on Domestic Violence and Sexual Abuse. During her time in the Kentucky General Assembly, she became known as a "progressive crusader" who supported women's rights and LGBTQ rights.

Personal life and education 
Stein was born in Birmingham, Alabama, in 1955. She attended Clinch Valley College of the University of Virginia, now known as University of Virginia's College at Wise, to receive her Bachelor of Arts in 1974. The year after her graduation, she worked as the town of Wise, Virginia's treasurer and clerk. She completed some studies at Virginia Tech, and she earned her Juris Doctor from the University of Kentucky College of Law in 1983. She is a retired family judge for Fayette County, Kentucky.

References 

1955 births
University of Kentucky College of Law alumni
Kentucky state senators
University of Virginia's College at Wise alumni
People from Birmingham, Alabama
Living people
Women state legislators in Kentucky
Members of the Kentucky House of Representatives
21st-century American women